John Eyre (born 9 October 1974) is an English retired football forward.

Career
Eyre's senior career began at Oldham Athletic in 1993. He made 10 appearances for them, scoring one goal before being loaned to Scunthorpe United.

Following a successful goalscoring spell on loan, Eyre joined Scunthorpe United permanently in 1995. He stayed there for five years, making over 150 appearances, before transferring to local rivals Hull City, his hometown club, in 1999. "Johnny Eyre" as he was affectionately known by Scunthorpe and then Hull fans, made over 50 appearances for The Tigers, scoring 13 times, before transferring to Oldham Athletic in 2001, where his senior career had begun.

Eyre made over 100 appearances for Oldham Athletic in his second stint at the club, before being released in 2005. He made further appearances for non-league clubs North Ferriby United and Brigg Town before retiring from professional football.

Following his retirement from playing football, Eyre briefly became a football agent, before a stint as a car salesman. He now works for hometown club Hull City as their kitman.

References

External links

Since 1888... The Searchable Premiership and Football League Player Database (subscription required)

1974 births
Living people
Footballers from Kingston upon Hull
English footballers
Association football forwards
Oldham Athletic A.F.C. players
Scunthorpe United F.C. players
Hull City A.F.C. players
North Ferriby United A.F.C. players
Brigg Town F.C. players
Premier League players
English Football League players